The European Commissioner for Transport is a member of the European Commission whose portfolio includes the planning and development of homogeneous transport policies and regulations across the Union, of the Trans-European Transport Network as well as of interoperation, navigation and signalling programs such as the European Rail Traffic Management System, the Galileo positioning system and the Single European Sky.

The current commissioner is Adina Ioana Vălean, from Romania.

Barrot (2004–2008)
Commissioner Barrot was approved by the European Parliament in 2004 and made a Vice-President in the Barroso Commission. However shortly after he began work, UKIP MEP Nigel Farage revealed Barrot had previously been convicted of fraud in 2000. French President Jacques Chirac had granted him presidential amnesty. A fact the Commissioner did not disclose during his hearing to the Parliament. Despite calls from some MEPs for him to be suspended he remained in office.

A major project during his term is the Galileo positioning system. Work on the system began a year before Barrot came to office and has developed since with the launch of the first satellite. However infighting within private sector partners may be a potential setback to the project with Barrot favouring greater funds from the EU budget . Other work includes recent guarantees of air passenger rights  and the Single European Sky.

Tajani (2008–2010)
Antonio Tajani was Commissioner from 2008 to 2010. Being head of the Forza Italia delegation in Europe, on 8 May 2008 he was appointed by the newly elected Italian prime minister, Silvio Berlusconi, as Italy's EU Commissioner. He replaced Franco Frattini who was appointed Minister of Foreign Affairs.

List of commissioners

See also
 Barrot scandal
 Directorate-General for Transport and Energy
 European Driving Licence
European Rail Traffic Management System
Galileo positioning system
 Trans-European transport networks
 Transport in the European Union

External links
 Commissioner's website
 Commission transport portal
 Transport white paper
 Galileo

Transport and the European Union
Transport